Melitturga is a genus of insect belonging to the family Andrenidae.

The genus was first described by Latreille in 1809.

The species of this genus are found in Eurasia and Africa.

Species:
 Melitturga clavicornis (Latreille, 1808)

References

Andrenidae
Hymenoptera genera